The 2022 Winter Paralympics torch relay was a three-day event leading up to the 2022 Winter Paralympics held in Beijing, China. In total, 565 torchbearers carried the torch.

In Stoke Mandeville, United Kingdom, the Paralympic Heritage Flame was lit as part of the torch relay. The torch relay began on March 2 and ended during the opening ceremony of the Games two days later.

See also
 2008 Summer Paralympics torch relay
 2008 Summer Olympics torch relay
 2018 Winter Paralympics torch relay
 2022 Winter Olympics torch relay
 2022 Asian Games torch relay
 2021 Summer University World Games torch relay

References

Torch relay
Paralympic torch relays